The University of Cincinnati Academic Health Center (AHC) is a collection of health colleges and institutions of the University of Cincinnati, Cincinnati, Ohio. It trains health care professionals and provides research and patient care. AHC has strong ties to UC Health, which includes the University of Cincinnati Medical Center and West Chester Hospital.

History

The academic health center concept originated with physician Daniel Drake, who founded the Medical College of Ohio, the precursor to the University of Cincinnati College of Medicine, in 1819.

A municipally owned college for most of its history, the University of Cincinnati joined Ohio's higher education system in July 1977. In 1982, its teaching hospital, known as the General Hospital and in its present location since 1915, was renamed the University of Cincinnati Hospital. It was later changed again to its current name, University Hospital. In 2003, the name was changed from the University of Cincinnati Medical Center to the University of Cincinnati Academic Health Center to better reflect its missions in education and research. In 2010, the Academic Health Center became an integral part of the newly formed UC Health organization.

AHC's national reputation for biomedical research includes the development of the first live, attenuated polio vaccine by Albert Sabin, who worked on the project at both the University of Cincinnati and the affiliated Cincinnati Children's Hospital Medical Center. Other achievements include definitive studies of the health effects of lead in children and development of the popular antihistamine Benadryl by George Rieveschl, who was working in the chemistry department at the time of his discovery.

In 1967, the College of Pharmacy became a unit of the University of Cincinnati Academic Health Center. In 2000 a fourth College, the College of Allied Health Sciences joined the University of Cincinnati Medical Center.

On June 6, 2007, the University of Cincinnati (UC) College of Pharmacy changed its name to the James L. Winkle College of Pharmacy. The college is only the second in UC's history to be named.

Components 
AHC includes four colleges, as well as specialized centers:
College of Allied Health Sciences
College of Medicine
College of Nursing
James L. Winkle College of Pharmacy
Hoxworth Blood Center
Metabolic Diseases Institute
Cincinnati Diabetes and Obesity Center
UC Cancer Institute
UC Neuroscience Institute
UC Heart, Lung and Vascular Institute

Facilities

AHC facilities include several buildings, research labs, and patient care sites, primarily in the Pill Hill neighborhood of Cincinnati:

Barrett Center
CARE/Crawley Building
Cardiovascular Research Center
French East Building
Health Sciences Library
Hoxworth Center
Joseph F. Kowalewski Hall
Kettering Laboratory Complex
Logan Hall
Marriott Kingsgate Conference Center
Medical Sciences Building
Procter Hall
University Hall
University of Cincinnati Gardner Neuroscience Institute
Vontz Center for Molecular Studies
Wherry Hall

UC Health
AHC is part of UC Health, which was established in 2009 after the Health Alliance was disbanded, which also includes hospitals and other entities:
University of Cincinnati Medical Center (flagship)
West Chester Hospital
Lindner Center of HOPE
Daniel Drake Center for Long Term Acute Care
University of Cincinnati Physicians

It also includes the following College of Medicine institutes: 
UC Cancer Institute
UC Heart, Lung and Vascular Institute
UC Gardner Neuroscience Institute

Partners and affiliates
AHC partners with many other health care institutions.
The Christ Hospital
Cincinnati Children's Hospital Medical Center
Department of Veteran Affairs Medical Center
Good Samaritan Hospital
The Jewish Hospital
Mayfield Clinic
Shriners Hospitals for Children—Cincinnati

College of Allied Health Sciences

The College of Allied Health Sciences (CAHS) provides education for allied health and health science professionals. CAHS became a college at the University of Cincinnati in March 1998. Its programs originated from various colleges at the University of Cincinnati.

Majors and programs
Doctoral
Communication Sciences and Disorders
Audiology
Physical Therapy
Master's
Communication Sciences and Disorders
Speech-language Pathology
Genetic Counseling
Health Administration (in conjunction with the College of Medicine and the Lindner College of Business)
Nutrition Sciences
Transfusion and Transplantation Services
Bachelor's
Advanced Medical Imaging Technology
Clinical Laboratory Science
Clinical Laboratory Science – Distance Learning
Communication Sciences and Disorders
Dietetics
Food and Nutrition
Concentration in Exercise Science
Concentration in Pre-Medicine
Health Information Management – Distance Learning
Health Sciences
Sports and Biomechanics Concentration
Exercise Science Concentration
Certificate
Clinical Laboratory Science
Dietetics
School of Social Work
Social Work

College of Medicine

 The College of Medicine was established by Daniel Drake in 1819 as the Medical College of Ohio, which was the first college of medicine established in the state of Ohio. It became a part of the University of Cincinnati in 1896 and is considered by some historians to be the oldest medical school west of the Allegheny Mountains. It is supposedly the second-oldest public college of medicine in the United States.

Other accomplishments include the development of the heart-lung machine, the Fogarty heart catheter, Benadryl, and the Clark oxygen electrode. The college also established the nation's first residency program in emergency medicine. The college is noted for its neurosurgical research into degenerative diseases including Alzheimer's disease and Parkinson's disease.

Ranked in the top one-third of American medical schools, the College attracts students from across the United States. In 2008, it became the first medical college in the country to implement the multiple mini interview system pioneered in Canada to better predict candidates with exceptional interpersonal skills, professionalism and ethical judgment. Other medical schools have since adopted the process. In addition to the usual application pathways, the University of Cincinnati offers a dual-admissions program known as Connections to high school students applying for undergraduate studies at the University where students are guaranteed admission to the school if they acquire the required grade point average  and MCAT scores.  The college attracts many undergraduate students to its summer research fellowships.

A curriculum revision effort involving more clinical instruction in the first two years of medical school was unveiled for the entering class of 2011.

In conjunction with the University of Cincinnati Medical Center, the college also sponsors 56 accredited residency and fellowship training programs through the Office of Graduate Medical Education.

Departments

Degree options

Centers of Excellence
UC Cancer Center
UC Diabetes and Metabolic Disease Institute
UC Heart, Lung and Vascular Institute
UC Gardner Neuroscience Institute

Rankings
In 2022 U.S. News & World Report magazine ranked the University of Cincinnati College of Medicine as tied for 42nd best medical school nationally in research and (also tied) 59th in primary care. In addition, the College of Medicine had the third best pediatrics program in the country according to the same report.

Notable alumni and faculty
 John Shaw Billings - began process to organize world's medical literature, now PubMed
 Gerald Buckberg - an American physician whose research interests centered in the area of myocardial protection and led to the introduction of blood cardioplegia
 Tommy Casanova - American physician, football player and politician
 M. H. Cleary - American lawyer, physician and activist
 Robin T. Cotton - English physician who is well known for his work in pediatric otolaryngology
 William W. Ellsberry - U.S. Representative from Ohio
 Thomas J. Fogarty - an American surgeon and medical device inventor best known for the invention of the embolectomy catheter, or balloon catheter
 Alonzo Garcelon - the 36th Governor of Maine, and a surgeon general of Maine during the American Civil War
 Marilyn Gaston - expert on sickle-cell disease
 Bertha Lund Glaeser (1862-1939) – American physician
 Jack Horsley - American former competition swimmer and Olympic medalist
 Frank F. Ledford Jr. an American orthopedic surgeon who served as the 37th Surgeon General of the United States Army
 Jeanne Lusher - an American physician, pediatric hematologist/oncologist, and a researcher in the field of bleeding disorders of childhood
 Anna Ornstein -  Auschwitz survivor, psychoanalyst and psychiatrist, author, speaker, and scholar
 Scott L. Pomeroy - the Bronson Crothers Professor of Neurology and Director of the Intellectual and Developmental Disabilities Research Center of Harvard Medical School
 James B. Preston - an American born neurophysiologist whose research was fundamental to discovering how our brains control movement
 Scott L. Rauch - President and Psychiatrist in Chief of McLean Hospital and Professor at Harvard Medical School
 Clarice Reid - an American pediatrician who led the National Sickle Cell Disease Program at the U.S. National Heart, Lung, and Blood Institute at the National Institutes of Health
 Albert Sabin - credited with developing the polio vaccine
 Alejandro Sánchez Alvarado - a molecular biologist, an investigator of the Howard Hughes Medical Institute, and Scientific Director of the Stowers Institute for Medical Research
 Steven Seifert - Medical toxicologist
 Carey A. Trimble - U.S. Representative from Ohio

College of Nursing 

Established in 1889, the University of Cincinnati College of Nursing was the first school to offer a baccalaureate degree in nursing in 1916. In 1942, the college became a charter member of the National League for Nursing. In 2002 the college was the first nursing school to offer cooperative education in addition to clinical time, and in 2010 it began a Doctorate of Nursing Practice. Successes include awarding over $1.0 million in scholarships and graduate assistantship stipends for the 2008 – 2009 academic year, ranking in the top 10 percent of American nursing programs, receiving over $2.6 million in extramural research awards during the 2009 fiscal year and developing partnerships with over 300 clinical sites.

In 1982, the college was one of eleven nursing schools that received the Robert Wood Johnson Teaching Nursing Home Project Grant. In 1987, IBM chose the college as one of fifteen to develop computer-assisted interactive video for health sciences. A nursing doctoral program and nurse anesthetist master's program were established in 1990. In 1992, the college established a joint master's degree (MSN/MBA) with the Lindner College of Business.

Centers
Aging with Dignity
Wedbush Centre
CATER
Nightingale Awards
Institute for Nursing Research and Scholarship

James L. Winkle College of Pharmacy

The College of Pharmacy is one of the oldest in the United States, and the oldest west of the Allegheny Mountains. It offers PharmD, MS and PhD degrees, including some online programs. Its graduates have a 100% placement rate prior to graduation. It is ranked in the top 25% of pharmacy programs in the US.

History
The Cincinnati College of Pharmacy was chartered by the Ohio Legislature in 1850 and it was the first pharmacy school west of the Allegheny Mountains. It operated as a private college until July 1954 when it became an integral part of the University of Cincinnati.

The college is named based on Jim Winkle's pledge of $10 million from his estate or trust. A Hamilton, Ohio, resident who graduated from the college in 1958.[9]

The College occupies newly remodeled research space in the Medical Sciences Building and was renovated in 2017.  That space includes new classrooms, teaching labs, student club meeting space, faculty and staff offices, conference rooms and an IT help desk.

Programs
The college offers multiple degree curricula, including Masters, PhD, and PharmD. It also offers online MS degree or certificate programs in cosmetic science, drug development and pharmacy leadership. Postgraduate residency (PGY-1) training opportunities in community pharmacy for PharmD graduates are available. A vibrant continuing education program exists to help enhance the skills of practicing pharmacists and pharmacy technicians.

Doctor of Pharmacy (PharmD) 
The Doctor of Pharmacy Degree is the only entry-level professional degree offered by the college. The program is fully accredited by the Accreditation Council for Pharmacy Education. Graduates are eligible to sit for the North American Pharmacist Licensure Examination (NAPLEX). Approximately 97 students are enrolled into each class.

The Doctor of Pharmacy curriculum is divided into the following: 
 At least three years of Pre-Pharmacy Education
 Four years of Professional Pharmacy Education
The PharmD professional degree program has been recognized by ACPE (Accreditation Council for Pharmacy Education) with special commendation in the areas of student affairs, curricular development and assessment and clinical experiential education.

Fulltime MS/PHD programs 
Students interested in obtaining a full-time research-based MS or PhD degree in Pharmaceutical Sciences generate innovative research findings under the guidance of a program training faculty with funded research activities.

Applicant selection is competitive. MS and PhD research programs focus on one of three areas: biomembrane science, experimental therapeutics, and health outcomes.

Graduate programs in drug development 
The MS program with drug development specialization (MSDD) is a two-year, online degree program in global pharmaceutical development (drugs/biologicals, drug products and devices). Tailored to meet the aspirations of working professionals, the program can be completed on a part-time basis with coursework offered on-site in the evening on weekdays or via distance learning.

A collaboration between academia, industry, and government, MSDD provides cross-disciplinary training in the scientific, regulatory and business aspects of drug development.

Graduate programs in cosmetic science 
The interdisciplinary cosmetic science programs provide opportunities to develop professional skills and fundamental concepts driving cosmetic science.

Started in 1973, the college's MS in Cosmetic Science is one of the oldest such graduate programs in the world. The Graduate programs in cosmetic science are as follows:  
 Capstone Project MS degree: MS degree in pharmaceutical sciences with emphasis in cosmetic science (30 credit hours)
 Graduate Certificate (GC) in Cosmetic Science: 12 credit hours covering skin and hair science as well as formulation science
 MS and PhD degrees: intensive research-based MS and PhD degrees in pharmaceutical science with emphasis in cosmetic science (on-site at Cincinnati)
 Courses for non-matriculated students: Online courses are available to non-matriculated students who have not applied for acceptance into the GC or MS Programs (a maximum of six (6) semester credit hours may be transferred to either program upon matriculation).
The graduate programs in cosmetic science grew from 17 students in 2013 to 96 students in 2017.

Master's degree and Graduate Certificate Programs in Pharmacy Leadership 
In 2016, the College became the first pharmacy school in the US to offer an online MS degree program and graduate certificate in pharmacy leadership.

These programs combine leadership and professional development in health care business and management courses.

These are the first programs at the University to be a partnership between three difference colleges:
 James L. Winkle College of Pharmacy
 Linder College of Business - Masters in Business Administration
 College of Allied Health - Masters in Health Administration
The programs are organized as preparation for leadership in settings such as independent and chain community pharmacies, health-system inpatient, outpatient and clinical pharmacies, clinical coordinator roles, managed care, industry, long-term care.

Strategic Plan: We are Pharmacy-  Rx for the Future 
In 2016, the College developed a new strategic plan, We are Pharmacy-  Rx for the Future, to help guide the college. The new tagline of the college is: Lead. Care. Transform.

Growth 
From 2014 to 2016, the college completed the largest hire of new faculty in the history of the college. Many of these new hires were in partnerships with healthcare organizations in the greater Cincinnati area. Research funding at the college increased, with 51% growth from 2015 to 2016 reaching a total of $8.9 million in 2016

References

External links
UC Academic Health Center
UC Health News

College of Allied Health Sciences
UC College of Allied Health Sciences official site
About the College of Allied Health Sciences

College of Medicine
UC College of Medicine official site
Vontz Center for Molecular Studies

College of Nursing
UC College of Nursing official site

James L. Winkle College of Pharmacy
UC James L. Winkle College of Pharmacy official site

Academic Health Center
Hospitals in Cincinnati
University of Cincinnati Academic Health Center
University of Cincinnati Academic Health Center
University of Cincinnati Academic Health Center
1819 establishments in Ohio
Frank Gehry buildings
Postmodern architecture in Ohio
Level 1 trauma centers